Money Back Policy is a 2013 Indian Malayalam-language comedy film directed by Jayaraj Vijay, Written & Produced by Manoj Ramsingh. Starring, Sreenivasan and Sarayu. Nedumudi Venu, Sreejith Vijay, Aishwarya Nambiar, Jayan Cherthala and Indrans play other main roles.

Plot
The film tells the story of Asokan, a security guard in a luxury hotel. Although his surroundings and friends grow, he has a zero growth. He is envious of rich people but he trains his wife and children to lead a simple life in order to hide his jealous nature. Fortune favours him when he learns that he has inherited a huge sum from his ancestors. He gives up his job to live a lavish life and to make more money. Life changes for Asokan when he meets Rupa, an insurance company advisor.

Cast
 Sreenivasan as Asokan
 Achuth Mohandas as a Leading Nameless Character Found On Asokan's Travel By Bus
 Sarayu as Asokan's wife
 Aishwarya Nambiar as Rupa
 Bhagath Manuel as Prem
 Nedumudi Venu as Onachan
 Sreejith Vijay as Kiran
 Jayan Cherthala as Advocate
 Lakshmi Sanal as Hostel Warden
 Indrans
 Shritha Sivadas as Girl in bus (cameo appearance)

References

External links
www.facebook.com/moneybackpolicy

2013 films
2010s Malayalam-language films
2013 comedy films
Indian comedy films